In the mathematical field of differential geometry, the exterior covariant derivative is an extension of the notion of exterior derivative to the setting of a differentiable principal bundle or vector bundle with a connection.

Definition
Let G be a Lie group and  be a principal G-bundle on a smooth manifold M. Suppose there is a connection on P; this yields a natural direct sum decomposition  of each tangent space into the horizontal and vertical subspaces. Let  be the projection to the horizontal subspace.

If ϕ is a k-form on P with values in a vector space V, then its exterior covariant derivative Dϕ is a form defined by

where vi are tangent vectors to P at u.

Suppose that  is a representation of G on a vector space V. If ϕ is equivariant in the sense that

where , then Dϕ is a tensorial -form on P of the type ρ: it is equivariant and horizontal (a form ψ is horizontal if .)

By abuse of notation, the differential of ρ at the identity element may again be denoted by ρ:

Let  be the connection one-form and  the representation of the connection in  That is,  is a -valued form, vanishing on the horizontal subspace. If ϕ is a tensorial k-form of type ρ, then

Unlike the usual exterior derivative, which squares to 0, the exterior covariant derivative does not. In general, one has, for a tensorial zero-form ϕ,

The form F is sometimes referred to as the field strength tensor, in analogy to the role it plays in electromagnetism. Note that D2 vanishes for a flat connection (i.e. when ).

If , then one can write

where  is the matrix with 1 at the -th entry and zero on the other entries. The matrix  whose entries are 2-forms on P is called the curvature matrix.

For vector bundles 
Given a smooth real vector bundle  with a connection  and rank , the exterior covariant derivative is a real-linear map on the vector-valued differential forms which are valued in :

The exterior covariant derivatives extends this map to general . There are several equivalent ways to define this object:
  Suppose that a vector-valued differential 2-form is regarded as assigning to each  a multilinear map  which is completely anti-symmetric. Then the exterior covariant derivative  assigns to each  a multilinear map  given by the formula

This can be verified by the Leibniz rule for covariant differentiation and for the Lie bracket of vector fields. The pattern established in the above formula in the case  can be directly extended to define the exterior covariant derivative for arbitrary .

for any differential -form  and any vector-valued form . This may also be viewed as a direct inductive definition. The above inductive formula then says that

This can be checked by considering a second local frame obtained by an arbitrary change-of-basis matrix; the inverse matrix provides the change-of-basis matrix for the 1-forms . When substituted into the above formula, the Leibniz rule as applied for the standard exterior derivative and for the covariant derivative  cancel out the arbitrary choice.
The exterior covariant derivative is then defined as being given by the functions

Then a vector-valued differential 2-form is expressed by differential 2-forms  and the connection is expressed by the connection 1-forms, a skew-symmetric  matrix of differential 1-forms .

In the case of the trivial real line bundle  with its standard connection, vector-valued differential forms and differential forms can be naturally identified with one another, and each of the above definitions coincides with the standard exterior derivative.

Given a principal bundle, any linear representation of the structure group defines an associated bundle, and any connection on the principal bundle induces a connection on the associated vector bundle. Differential forms valued in the vector bundle may be naturally identified with fully anti-symmetric tensorial forms on the total space of the principal bundle. Under this identification, the notions of exterior covariant derivative for the principal bundle and for the vector bundle coincide with one another.

Depending on how the exterior covariant derivative is formulated, various alternative but equivalent definitions of curvature (some without the language of exterior differentiation) can be obtained.

It is a well-known fact that the composition of the standard exterior derivative with itself is zero: . In the present context, this can be regarded as saying that the standard connection on the trivial line bundle  has zero curvature.

Example 
 Bianchi's second identity, which says that the exterior covariant derivative of Ω is zero (that is) can be stated as: .

Notes

References

 

 

Connection (mathematics)
Differential geometry
Fiber bundles